Paul Grégoire Pierre Wittouck (6 August 1851 – 9 November 1917) was a Belgian industrialist. He and his brother Frantz Wittouck became the largest sugar manufacturers in Belgium in the period leading up to the Great War. He was the grandson of Lawyer and High Magistrate Guillaume Wittouck.

Sugar manufacturer

Paul and his brother  (1855–1914) owned a sugar factory in Wanze. They were the first in Belgium to produce crystallized sugar, and to sell sugar lumps. The sugar factory at Wanze became the largest in Belgium after its reorganization by Paul Wittouck in 1887. The manufacturing steps included carbonation, filtration, evaporation, cooking and processing by turbines.

In 1894 the brothers took over Vinckenbosch & Cie and turned it into a limited company.
Vinckenbosch's sugar refinery of Tienen had been founded in 1836–38.
The brothers faced fierce competition from other sugar manufacturers in Belgium, but emerged as the dominant firm.
Through a series of technical innovations and improvement the volume of sugar produced in Tienen rose from 7,000 tonnes in 1894 to 62,000 tonnes in 1913.
The company began to export sugar and the take over other Belgian companies.
The Wanze and Tienen plants were integrated into one industrial group shortly before the outbreak of World War I in 1914.
During the war the factories struggled to continue operations, but were able to manufacture enough to supply the major cities.

Château

The Château de La Fougeraie was built for Paul Wittouck in 1911 by the architects Louis Süe (1875–1968) and Paul Huillard (1875–1966).
The engineer was L. Bogaerts. Gustave Louis Jaulmes (1873–1959) decorated the interior.
Sue, Huillard and Jaulmes avoided Art Nouveau for the château, and instead chose the fashionable Louis XVI style "à la Greque".

Notes

Sources

1851 births
1917 deaths
Belgian businesspeople
People from Sint-Pieters-Leeuw